The life-process model of addiction is the view that addiction is not a disease but rather a habitual response and a source of gratification and security that can be understood only in the context of social relationships and experiences. This model of addiction is in opposition to the disease model of addiction. It was originated and advocated by Stanton Peele in his book The Truth About Addiction and Recovery (with Archie Brodsky and Mary Arnold, 1991).

Proponents of the life-process model argue that unitary biological mechanisms cannot account for addictive behavior and thus do not support using the term disease. They instead emphasize the individual's ability to overcome addiction by augmenting life options and coping mechanics, pursuing values and purpose, repairing relationships, and expressing personal agency — all of which occur through normal human development. Indeed, the disease model impedes these natural life processes. The biological mechanisms typically claimed to underlie all forms of addiction (CREB and ΔFosB) — while psychosocial factors are considered as only tangential issues leading to lesser or greater use and exposure — were reviewed by Eric J. Nestler in 2013. The range of data opposing these assertions and disputing the chronic relapsing disease nature of addiction were reviewed by Gene M. Heyman in 2013a and 2013b, and by Stanton Peele in 2016. Peele particularly cites US and international epidemiological data indicating worsening mental health and drug use outcomes dating from the 1990s, when American investment in neuropsychiatric approaches and brain research rose to billions of dollars annually.

See also
Stanton Peele
Alcoholics Anonymous
Moderation Management
SMART Recovery
Substance use disorder

References

Addiction psychiatry
Substance-related disorders